The competition for the Best Tunisian footballer of the year was established by the agency Tunis Afrique Presse in 2012, via a referendum open to sports journalists, coaches and technicians, but also on its website to designate the best Tunisian footballer of the year.

Winners

By year

Overall table

Breakdown of winners

Winners by league

Winners by club

References

External links 

 TAP Website

Football in Tunisia